The Quaderno was a subnotebook  produced by Olivetti in two versions from 1992: Quaderno (PT-XT-20) and Quaderno 33 (PT-AT-60).

History
When it made its debut in 1992, this model realised the idea of a laptop that was smaller (having the same footprint as an A5 sheet) and lighter (1 kg) than contemporary laptops. The first version did not have the expected success, despite having an excellent processor and also features unknown to its contemporaries, such as the microphone and integrated amplifiers. This failure was mostly due to the limitations of the operating system and bundled software which did not fully exploit the potential of the computer's design and capabilities. For this reason, Olivetti decided to present a new version just one year after the first, the Quaderno 33, equipped with the Windows 3.1 operating system.

Reception
In a 1993 review, the original Quaderno was described as "a crippled DOS-compatible machine with an NEC V30 processor equivalent to an Intel 8086", noting that "the best thing about the old Quaderno was its ability to digitally record dictation using its built-in microphone". These voice recording capabilities were exposed by "cassette deck" controls on the top of the case, and with the internal fax modem connected to the telephone network, the computer could act as an answering machine and record voice messages. Despite providing an array of expansion ports - serial, parallel, video out, and a dual-purpose port for modem or PS/2 keyboard and mouse - the sockets were a proprietary Olivetti design requiring special cables at about £10 (Equal to £21.71 or 25,80€ in 2022 ) each, and to use the fax modem required an extra £80 (£147.42 or 175,14€ in 2022) purchase of the necessary software, this being regarded as rather exploitative.

The keyboard offered a standard layout and additional function keys, with the latter acting as shortcuts to launch applications, although unlike other laptops, the software to support these capabilities was loaded from the hard drive and not from ROM, thus requiring the user to retain the driver files responsible. The reduced size of the keyboard was not always well received, with claims that touch-typing was not possible on the small keys and that two-finger typing was therefore necessary. In contrast to the earlier Quaderno model, whose principal software was "a suite of personal productivity applications", the latter model came with Windows 3.1, Microsoft Works and Lotus Organizer. A more capable VGA-resolution display was welcomed, along with its integration with the power management regime that permitted a battery life of up to 6 hours on the standard nickel-cadmium batteries.

Awards

The Quaderno received the following awards:

 1992, 25° Premio SMAU Industrial Design (Italia)  
 1993, IF Product Design Award (Germany)

Notable users
Terry Pratchett used a 1992 Quaderno for writing when travelling.

Specifications
Scheme: Ugo Carena and Alessandro Santalucia
Design: Mario Bellini and Hagai Shvadron

Quaderno (PT-XT-20)

CPU: NEC μPD70280 V51, integrating a 16 MHz NEC V30HL core with a set of PC peripherals
Memory: 1 MB (640 KB + 360 KB LIM expansion)
Hard disk: 20 MB, 2.5-inch
Operating system: MS-DOS 5.0
PCMCIA: Type II
Dimensions: 
Mass: 1.05 kg
Display: 14 x 10.5 cm LCD, DCGA (640 x 400), 4 grey levels
Input device: integrated trackball
Battery: 6 AA batteries Ni-Cad 7.2V

Quaderno 33 (PT-AT-60)

Differences from the earlier model:

CPU: 20MHz AMD 386SXLV
Memory: 4 MB (expandable with PCMCIA RAM card to 12 MB)
Hard disk: 60 MB
Operating system: MS-DOS 5.0 with Windows 3.1
Display: 7-inch LCD with backlight, VGA (640 x 480), 16 grey levels
Dimensions: 
Mass: 1.35 kg
Battery: Ni-Cad batteries, option for Ni-MH batteries

References

Literature 

 Olivetti Quaderno: più di un notebook in metà spazio MCmicrocomputer (June 1992) pages 118–121
 Olivetti Quaderno MCmicrocomputer (July/August 1992) pages 128–130
 Olivetti Quaderno 33 MCmicrocomputer (July/August 1993) pages 154–158

Subnotebooks
Olivetti personal computers
Computer-related introductions in 1992